The Journal of Trading was a quarterly academic journal covering tools and strategies in institutional trading including topics such as algorithmic trading, transaction costs, execution options, trading platforms, liquidity, and multi-asset trading. Its editor in chief is Brian R. Bruce (Finance Institute, Southern Methodist University).

External links

Finance journals
Publications established in 2006
Quarterly journals
English-language journals